The University of South Carolina Union (USC Union) is a satellite campus of the University of South Carolina (USC) in Union, South Carolina. It has a branch campus in Laurens, South Carolina. It is a part of the University of South Carolina System and one of the four regional USC campuses which make up Palmetto College. USC Union is accredited by the Southern Association of Colleges and Schools and awards associate degrees in both art and science. USC Union is also able to offer the USC Aiken Bachelor of Science in Nursing through a partnership with USC Aiken, allowing students to complete all four years of study at either the Union or Laurens campus.

History
In the 1960s, the citizens of Union formed the Union County Commission for Higher Education to attract a college to their area.  The University of South Carolina sought to expand its reach throughout the state and agreed to build an extension campus in Union. Classes began at the campus in 1965 with an initial enrollment of 51 students.

Athletics 
USC Union's athletics department, USC Union Bantam Athletics (or simply Bantam Athletics), is home to a variety of competitive sports teams including men's soccer and baseball as well as women's volleyball and softball, all of which compete at the junior college level. Bantam Athletics also has a rifle team, a bass fishing team, and e-sports gaming which compete at the club level.

Clubs and Organizations 
USC Union has a number of student organizations:

 African American Association
 Art Club
 Garden and Botany Club
 Research Club
 Rotaract Club
 Student Government Association

Festivals 
USC Union hosts two annual festivals.

Upcountry Literary Festival 
Created and directed by Randall Ivey, the Upcountry Literary Festival allows poets, musicians, storytellers, playwrights, essayists, and short-story writers the opportunity to gather and share their works. It was held virtually in 2021.

Latin American Film Festival 
The Latin American Film Festival is held in celebration of Hispanic Heritage Month.

See also
Central Graded School
Main Street Grammar School

References

External links
Official website

University of South Carolina System
University of South Carolina Union
Education in Union County, South Carolina
Buildings and structures in Union County, South Carolina
Education in Laurens County, South Carolina